This is a list of all battles involving the United States during World War II.

{| class="wikitable sortable" 
!Name!!data-sort-type="date"|Start Date!!data-sort-type="date"|End!!Location!!Campaign!! U.S. Casualties!!Result!!Opposing Force
!Notes
|-
|Battle of the Atlantic
|September 13, 1941
|May 8, 1945
|Atlantic Ocean, North Sea, Irish Sea, Labrador Sea, Gulf of St. Lawrence, Caribbean Sea, Gulf of Mexico, Outer Banks, Arctic Ocean
|
|Around 18,000 sailors and merchant seamen killed 
|Allied victory
|Germany, Japan (Possibly), Currently unknown
|
 Longest military campaign of World War II 
 U.S. involvement began before the formal U.S. declaration of war on Germany
 Attempted blockade of the United Kingdom and the Soviet Union through attacks on merchant shipping and Allied naval ships bringing supplies and military reinforcement from North America
 Allied victory achieved through implementation of convoy system
 Eventually resulted in Allied naval superiority over German surface raiders and U-boats. 
|-
|Operation Torch
|November 8, 1942
|November 10, 1942
|Morocco and Algeria
|North African Campaign
|1,200(479 killed, 720 wounded)
|Allied victory
|Vichy France
Germany

Italy
|
 first involvement of American forces in Mediterranean and Middle East theatre 
 first major American airborne assault
 resulted in Free French control of French West Africa and Anglo-American occupation of western French North Africa
 lead to full German occupation of Vichy France
|-
|Battle of the Kasserine Pass
|February 19, 1943
|February 25, 1943
|Kasserine Pass, Tunisia
|Tunisia Campaign
|6,500(1,000+ killed); or, 9,195(2,572 killed, 56 wounded and 10 captured or missing)
|Axis victory
|Germany and Italy
|
 resulted in major reorganization of the U.S. Army
 resulted in delay of planned amphibious invasion of France
|-
|Battle of El Guettar
|March 23, 1943
|April 7, 1943
|El Guettar, Tunisia
|Tunisia Campaign
|~5,000
|Indecisive
|Germany and Italy
|
|-
|Battle of Gela
|July 10, 1943
|July 12, 1943
|Gela, Sicily
|Italian Campaign
|2,300, 1 destroyer sunk
|Allied victory
|Germany and Italy
|
 first battle of Allied invasion of Sicily
 resulted in increased prioritization of naval artillery support 
|-
|Battle of Salerno
|September 9, 1943
|September 16, 1943
|Salerno, Italy
|Italian Campaign
|4,870
|Allied victory
|Germany and Italy
|
 first battle of the Allied invasion of mainland Italy
|-
|Battle of Monte Cassino
|January 17, 1944
|May 18, 1944
|Monte Cassino, Italy
|Italian Campaign
|100,000+ (Total allied casualties)
|Allied victory
|Germany
|
 resulted in controversial bombing of Monte Cassino Abbey
 resulted in defeat of the Senger Line
|-
|Battle of Anzio
|January 22, 1944
|June 5, 1944
|Anzio and Nettuno, Italy
|Italian Campaign
|23,173(5,538 killed, 15,558 wounded and 2,947 captured or missing)
|Allied victory
|Germany
|
 resulted in heavy fighting 
 allowed the German Tenth Army to withdraw to the Gothic Line
|-
|Battle of Normandy
|June 6, 1944
|July 24, 1944 
|Normandy, France
|Operation Overlord
|63,360(16,293 killed, 43,221 wounded and 6,180 captured or missing)
|Allied victory
|Germany
|
 successfully established Allied beachhead in France and neutralized the Atlantic Wall 
 resulted in withdrawal of German forces in northern France to Paris
|-
|Battle of Graignes
|June 10, 1944
|June 12, 1944
|Graignes, France
|Operation Overlord
|32 (17 executed)
|American victory
|Germany
|
 Failed in objective to capture Graignes
 Followed by Waffen-SS massacre of American prisoners of war
|-
|Battle of Carentan
|June 10, 1944
|June 14, 1944
|Carentan, France
|Operation Overlord
|
|American victory
|Germany
|
 Consolidated American beachheads against German counterattack
 allowed seizure of the Cotentin Peninsula
|-
|Battle for Brest
|August 7, 1944
|September 19, 1944
|Brittany, France
|Operation Overlord
|~4,000
|Allied victory
|Germany
|
 Resulted in seizure of Brest 
 German sabotage prevented use of port facilities
|-
|Operation Dragoon
|August 15, 1944
|September 14, 1944
|Southern France
|Operation Overlord
|15,574(7,301 killed, 5,804 wounded, 3,098 captured or missing)
|Allied victory
|Germany
|
 Allied capture of Southern France
 Free French recapture of Toulon and Marseille
 withdrawal of Army Group G from Southern France through the Rhône River Valley to the Vosges
|-
|Battle of Nancy
|September 5, 1944
|September 15, 1944
|Nancy, France
|Siegfried Line campaign
|2,851+
|American victory
|Germany
|
 American capture of Nancy and crossing of the Moselle River
|-
|Operation Market Garden
|September 17, 1944
|September 25, 1944
|The Netherlands
|Siegfried Line campaign
|3,974
|Allied operational failure
|Germany
|
 Successfully liberated large parts of the Netherlands including Eindhoven and Nijmegen
 created a salient limiting V-2 rocket attacks
 failed in operational objective to create bridgehead across the Rhine River into Germany and end the war by the end of 1944
 Resulted in major reorientation of Western Allied military strategy
|-
|Battle of Hürtgen Forest
|September 19, 1944
|February 10, 1945
|Hurtgen Forest, German-Belgian border
|Siegfried Line campaign
|33,000
|German defensive victory
|Germany
|
 longest ever battle fought by the U.S. Army
 Failure to capture the Rur River
|-
|Battle of Metz
|September 27, 1944
|December 13, 1944
|Metz, France
|Siegfried Line campaign
|2,851+
|American tactical victory, German strategic victory
|Germany
|
 American capture of Metz 
 hindered advance of U.S. Third Army
|-
|Battle of Aachen
|October 2, 1944
|October 21, 1944
|Aachen, Germany
|Siegfried Line campaign
|5,000
|American victory
|Germany
|
 One of largest urban battles fought by the U.S. Army during the war
 Resulted in American occupation of Aachen and destruction of much of the city 
 First German city captured by the Western Allies
 Delayed Allied advance into the Ruhr Basin
|-
|Battle of the Bulge
|December 16, 1944
|January 25, 1945
|The Ardennes, Belgium, Luxembourg, and Germany
|Siegfried Line campaign
|89,500(19,000 killed, 47,500 wounded, 23,000 missing)
|Allied victory
|Germany
|
 Final German offensive on the Western Front
 Caused temporary delay of Western Allied advance
 Failure in German strategic objective to recapture Antwerp, encircle Allied forces in the Low Countries, and force the Western Allies to draft a separate peace treaty
 resulted in depletion and collapse of Wehrmacht forces, ultimately accelerating Western Allied advance and capture of the Siegfried Line as well as the Soviet Union's Vistula–Oder Offensive on the Eastern Front
|-
|Operation Nordwind
|January 1, 1945
|January 25, 1945
|Alsace and Lorraine, France
|Siegfried Line campaign
|12,000(3,000 killed, 9,000 wounded or missing)
|German operational failure
|Germany
|
 Failure of German strategic objective to destroy Allied forces in Alsace and Lorraine
 Resulted in German salient in central Alsace 
|-
|Colmar Pocket
|January 20, 1945
|February 9, 1945
|Alsace, France
|Siegfried Line campaign
|8,000
|Allied victory
|Germany
|
 Failure of German objective to recapture northern Alsace 
 Resulted in full French control of Alsace 
|-
|Ruhr Pocket
|March 7, 1945
|April 21, 1945
|Ruhr Area, Germany
|Western Allied invasion of Germany
|
|Allied victory
|Germany
|
 Successful encirclement and division of Army Group B
 Surrender of German Fifteenth Army and German forces under Walter Model's command 
 Western Allied occupation of the Ruhr and advance towards the Elbe River
|-
|Operation Varsity
|March 24, 1945
|
|Wesel, Germany
|Western Allied invasion of Germany
|2,700
|Allied victory
|Germany
|
 Allied airborne operations in Hamminkeln and Wesel to secure British invasion and occupation of northwestern Germany 
 Successfully established bridgeheads on the Rhine 
|-
|Battle of Frankfurt
|March 26, 1945
|March 29, 1945
|Frankfurt, Germany
|Western Allied invasion of Germany
|unknown
|American victory
|Germany
|
 Achieved Allied capture of Frankfurt
|-
|Battle of Paderborn
|March 30, 1945
|March 31, 1945
|Paderborn, Germany
|Western Allied invasion of Germany
|
|American victory
|Germany
|
 Major General Maurice Rose is killed in battle and is the highest-ranking U.S. Armed Forces officer to be killed in action at the Western Front.
|-
|Battle of Kassel
|April 1, 1945
|April 4, 1945
|Kassel, Germany
|Western Allied invasion of Germany
|Unknown
|American victory
|Germany
|
 Victory allowed U.S. Third Army advance through Hesse towards Frankfurt am Main
|-
|Battle of Heilbronn
|April 4, 1945
|April 12, 1945
|Heilbronn, Germany
|Western Allied invasion of Germany
|422 (60 killed, 250 wounded, 112 missing)
|American victory
|Germany
|
 House-to-house combat involving Volkssturm auxiliary units
 Resulted in American occupation of Heilbronn and the Neckar River 
 Continuation of southeastern advance towards Heidelberg and Bavaria
|-
|Battle of Nuremberg
|April 16, 1945
|April 20, 1945
|Nuremberg, Germany
|Western Allied invasion of Germany
|
|American victory
|Germany
|
 Most intense urban battle of the war.
 Considered a major blow to Germany.
|-
|Spring 1945 offensive in Italy
|April 6, 1945
|May 2, 1945
|Northern Italy
|Italian Campaign
|16,258(1,288 killed, 15,453 wounded and 93 missing)
|Allied victory
|Germany
|
 Planned Allied offensive towards Lombardy 
 Ended with the death of Benito Mussolini and complete surrender of Axis forces
 Final battle of the Italian Campaign
|-
|Attack on Pearl Harbor
|December 7, 1941
|
|Pearl Harbor, Hawaii, United States
|
|3,592(2,345 killed and 1,247 wounded)
|Japanese tactical victory
|Japan
|
 Preventive strike on the U.S. Pacific Fleet to prevent American intervention in planned Japanese offensive into Southeast Asia
 Major Japanese tactical victory resulting in the destruction of American naval ships and base installations
 Failure of Japanese objective to destroy American aircraft carriers and achieve decisive victory
 Caused the United States to formally enter World War II and declare war on Japan, Germany, and Italy 
 Resulted in reorganization and buildup of the U.S. Armed Forces
 Resulted in shift in public opinion in favor of entering the war 
|-
|Battle of Wake Island
|December 8, 1941
|December 23, 1941
|Wake Island
|
|627(130 killed, 49 wounded and 448 captured)
|Japanese victory
|Japan
|
 Successful Japanese invasion and occupation of Wake Island despite U.S. Marine Corps resistance 
 Continued Japanese occupation until the end of the war
|-
|Battle of Bataan
|January 7, 1942
|April 9, 1942
|Bataan Peninsula, Philippines
|Philippines campaign (1941–1942)
|15,000 captured and interned
|Japanese victory
|Japan
|
 Last stand of American and Filipino forces 
 Ended in Japanese capture of Bataan Peninsula
|-
|Doolittle Raid
|April 18, 1942
|
|Tokyo and other Japanese cities
|
|3 killed and 8 later died in captivity/executed
|US propaganda victory
|Japan
|
 First American air raid against the Japanese Home Islands
 Intended as retaliation for the Pearl Harbor attack 
 Minor damage to Japanese urban and military targets, including Tokyo
 Improved American morale and damaged Japanese morale
|-
|Battle of the Coral Sea
|May 4, 1942
|May 8, 1942
|Coral Sea, between Australia, New Guinea, and the Solomon Islands
|New Guinea campaign
|656 killed
|Japanese tactical victory, Allied strategic victory
|Japan
|
 First naval battle in history fought between aircraft carriers 
 Japanese tactical victory; ended in successful invasion and occupation of Tulagi and the British Solomon Islands
 American strategic victory; prevented Japanese invasion of Port Moresby
 Resulted in damage to Japanese aircraft carriers Shōkaku and Zuikaku
 Resulted in fragility of Japanese forces in the South West Pacific
|-
|Battle of Milne Bay
|August 25, 1942
|September 7, 1942
|Milne Bay, Papua New Guinea
|New Guinea campaign
|14 killed
|Allied victory
|Japan
|
 Attempted capture of Allied airfields at Milne Bay
 Resulted in Japanese withdrawal due to unexpected participation of the First Australian Imperial Force and Allied attacks on Japanese supply lines
|-
|Battle of Wau
|29 January 1943
|February 4, 1943
|Wau, Papua New Guinea
|New Guinea campaign
|
|Allied victory
|Japan
|
 Japanese attempt to fight back after the battle is over but are repelled.
|-
|Battle of Wakde
|18 May 1944
|21, May 1944
|Wakde, Indonesia
|New Guinea campaign
|147 (40 killed, 107 wounded)
|American victory
|Japan
|
 Wakde Airfield is obtained.
|-
|Battle of Biak
|27 May 1944
|August 17, 1944
|Biak, Indonesia
|New Guinea campaign
|
|Allied victory
|Japan
|
 Biak becomes a logistical center for the Allies.
|-
|Battle of Driniumor River
|July 10, 1944
|August 25, 1944
|Near Aitape, Papua New Guinea
|New Guinea campaign
|3,000 (440 killed and 2,560 wounded)
|American victory
|Japan
|
 Resulted in withdrawal of Japanese forces after heavy fighting
|-
|Battle of Sansapor
|July 30, 1944
|August 31, 1944
|Bird's Head Peninsula, Indonesia
|New Guinea campaign
|49 (15 killed and 35 wounded)
|American victory
|Japan
|
|-
|Battle of Midway
|June 3, 1942
|June 7, 1942
|Near Midway Atoll
|
|307 killed
|American victory
|Japan
|
 Considered by historians to be one of the most important naval battles in history 
 Contributed to depletion of manpower and material of the Imperial Japanese Navy
 Failure to divert American aircraft carriers into trap and invade Midway Island in preparation for future offensives against Fiji, Samoa, and Hawaii
 Ended in destruction of four Japanese fleet carriers
 Turning point in the Pacific War resulting in Japanese retreat and American offensives
|-
|Battle of Guadalcanal
|August 7, 1942
|February 9, 1943
|Guadalcanal in the Solomon Islands
|Solomon Islands campaign
|~6,000(1,600 killed, 4,400 wounded and missing they were never found)
|Allied victory
|Japan
|
 Major Allied victory recapturing the Solomon Islands
 Ended in withdrawal of Japanese forces from the Solomon Islands
 Contributed to depletion of Imperial Japanese Army
 Forced Japanese military to end offensives and shift to defensive strategy
|-
|Battle of the Santa Cruz Islands
|October 25, 1942
|October 27, 1942
|Santa Cruz Islands, Solomon Islands
|Solomon Islands campaign
|266 killed
|Japanese tactical victory, American strategic victory
|Japan
|
 Ended in retreat of Allied surface ships 
 Resulted in loss of Japanese aircrews
|-
|Battle of Tarawa
|November 20, 1943
|November 23, 1943
|Betio, Tarawa Atoll
|Gilbert and Marshall Islands campaign
|3,296(1,000 killed and 2,296 wounded)
|American victory
|Japan
|
 American amphibious landing 
 Resulted in capture of Tarawa Atoll after heavy fighting
|-
|Battle of Makin
|November 20, 1943
|November 24, 1943
|Makin Atoll, Gilbert Islands
|Gilber and Marshall Islands campaign
|948 (763 killed and 185 wounded)
|American victory
|Japan
|
|-
|Battle of Kwajalein
|January 31, 1944
|February 3, 1944
|Kwajalein Atoll, Marshall Islands
|Gilbert and Marshall Islands campaign
|1,964(372 killed and 1,592 wounded)
|American victory
|Japan
|
 Ended in American seizure of Kwajelein Atoll 
 Provided major boost to American morale 
|-
|Battle of Eniwetok
|February 17, 1944
|February 23, 1944
|Enewetok Atoll, Marshall Islands
|Gilbert and Marshall Islands campaign
|1,269 (313 killed, 879 wounded, 77 missing)
|American victory
|Japan
|
 Ended in seizure of Eniwetok as a forward base for future offensives into the Japanese South Seas Mandate
|-
|Battle of Saipan
|June 15, 1944
|July 9, 1944
|Saipan, Mariana Islands
|Mariana and Palau Islands campaign
|13,313(2,949 killed and 10,364 wounded)
|American victory
|Japan
|
 Ended in American occupation of Saipan
 Brought Japanese home islands within range of American B-29 Superfortress heavy bombers 
 Prompted resignation of Japanese Prime Minister Hideki Tojo
|-
|Battle of the Philippine Sea
|June 19, 1944
|June 20, 1944
|Philippine Sea
|Mariana and Palau Islands campaign
|109 killed
|American victory
|Japan
|
 Largest carrier battle in history
 Completely eliminated Japanese ability to mount large-scale carrier operations 
 Ended in Japanese withdrawal from the Philippine Sea and American offensive towards the Philippines 
|-
|Battle of Guam 
|July 21, 1944
|August 8, 1944
|Guam, Mariana Islands
|Mariana and Palau Islands campaign
|7,800(1,747 killed and 6,053 wounded)
|Allied victory
|Japan
|
 Ended Japanese occupation of Guam
|-
|Battle of Tinian
|July 24, 1944
|August 1, 1944
|Tinian, Mariana Islands
|Mariana and Palau Islands campaign
|1,919 (326 killed and 1,593 wounded)
|American victory
|Japan
|
 Ended in American capture of Tinian as forward air base
|-
|Battle of Peleliu
|September 15, 1944
|November 27, 1944
|Peleliu, Palau Islands
|Mariana and Palau Islands campaign
|9,804(1,794 killed and 8,010 wounded)
|American victory
|Japan
|
 Ended in American capture of Peleliu as forward air base
 Controversial due to high casualty rate of the 1st Marine Division and the 81st Infantry Division alongside minor strategic value
|-
|Battle of Angaur
|September 17, 1944
|September 30, 1944
|Angaur, Palau Islands
|Mariana and Palau Islands campaign
|260 killed
|American victory
|Japan
|
 Ended in American capture of Angaur as forward air base
|-
|Battle of Leyte Gulf
|October 23, 1944
|October 26, 1944
|Leyte Gulf, Philippines
|Philippines campaign (1944–45)
|~1,500 killed
|Allied victory
|Japan
|
 Sometimes considered to be the "largest naval battle in history"
 Final naval battle in history fought between battleships 
 Saw the introduction of Japanese kamikaze attacks
 Isolated Japanese holdings in Southeast Asia from the Home Islands 
 Allied defeat of Japanese naval forces despite their full mobilization 
 Commenced American offensive into the Philippines
|-
|Battle of Luzon
|January 9, 1945
|August 15, 1945
|Luzon, Philippines
|Philippines campaign (1944–45)
|~37,870(8,310 killed and 29,560 wounded)
|Allied victory
|Japan
|
 Highest net casualty for U.S. forces during World War II 
 Resulted in Allied liberation of Luzon
|-
|Battle of Manila
|February 3, 1945
|March 3, 1945
|Manila, Philippines
|Philippines campaign (1944–45)
|6,575(1,010 killed and 5,565 wounded)
|Allied victory
|Japan
|
 One of the most intense urban battles fought by American forces during the war 
 Accompanied with massacres of Filipino civilians by Japanese forces
|-
|Battle of Bessang Pass
|June 1, 1945
|June 15, 1945
|Ilocos Sur,
Philippines
|Philippines campaign (1944–45)
|339 (119 killed and 220 wounded)
|Allied victory
|Japan
|
 Ended in entrapment of Japanese forces under General Tomoyuki Yamashita's command 
|-
|Battle of Iwo Jima
|February 19, 1945
|March 26, 1945
|Iwo Jima, Japan
|Volcano and Ryukyu Islands campaign
|26,038(6,821 killed and 19,217 wounded)
|American victory
|Japan
|
 One of the most intensive battles of the Pacific theatre 
 initially controversial due to heavy casualties and low strategic value of Iwo Jima 
 Ended in the American occupation of Iwo Jima aided by overwhelming military superiority, later used as an emergency landing base for American bombers
 Resulted in most of the Japanese combatants being killed in action
 Site of Joe Rosenthal's iconic photograph Raising the Flag on Iwo Jima. 
|-
|Battle of Okinawa
|April 1, 1945
|June 22, 1945
|Okinawa, Japan
|Volcano and Ryukyu Islands campaign
|51,429(12,513 killed and 38,916 wounded)
|Allied victory
|Japan
|
 largest amphibious battle of the Pacific theatre of World War II 
 Ended in heavy casualties for both sides 
 Large-scale deaths of Okinawan civilians. 
 Ended in U.S. occupation of Okinawa 
 Intended as a preparatory battle to the abandoned Western Allied invasions of Kyūshū and Honshu. 
 Heavy civilian and combat casualties may have influenced U.S. decision to use atomic bombs against Hiroshima and Nagasaki
|-
|-
|Battle of Java Sea
|February 27, 1942
|February 27, 1942,
|Java Sea
|Java Sea 
|(2300 Americans Killed)
|Japanese victory
|
|

References 

Battles and operations of World War II
Battles